Dolophrosyne elongata is a moth of the family Notodontidae first described by Hering in 1925. It is found in Peru and Bolivia.

Adults are completely dark chocolate brown, without any markings on the wings.

References

Moths described in 1925
Notodontidae of South America